A walking stick is a device used primarily to aid walking that may also provide postural support or serve as a fashion accessory or means of self-defense.

Walking stick may also refer to:

Assistive cane, a walking stick used as a crutch or mobility aid
Phasmatodea or walking sticks, an order of insects
The Walking Stick, a 1970 British film directed by Eric Till